State Route 245 (SR 245) is a  route that serves as a bypass to the northeast of Greenville between SR 10 and SR 185.

Route description
The southern terminus of SR 245 is located at its intersection with SR 10 to the east of downtown Greenville. From this point, the route travels in a northwesterly direction to its northern terminus at its intersection with SR 185 to the north of downtown Greenville.

Major intersections

References

External links

Alabama Department of Transportation county road maps for Butler (Adobe Acrobat reader required for maps; enlargement of maps necessary for legibility)

245
Transportation in Butler County, Alabama
Greenville, Alabama